Attock City Junction Railway Station (Urdu and ) is located in Attock city, Attock district, Punjab province, Pakistan.

Train routes
The following trains stop/terminate/originate from Attock City Junction station:

Train Stops
Attock Passenger, Awam Express, Khyber Mail, Jand Passenger and Rehman Baba Express have stop at Attock city Railway Station.

See also
 List of railway stations in Pakistan
 Pakistan Railways

References

Railway stations in Attock District
Railway stations on Kotri–Attock Railway Line (ML 2)
Railway stations on Karachi–Peshawar Line (ML 1)